Lah Meleh may refer to:
 Lah Meleh-ye Olya-ye Jowkar
 Lah Meleh-ye Sofla-ye Jowkar